Salem El-Jisr (born 1 January 1932) is a Lebanese former athlete. He competed in the men's shot put at the 1960 Summer Olympics.

References

External links
 

1932 births
Possibly living people
Athletes (track and field) at the 1960 Summer Olympics
Lebanese male shot putters
Olympic athletes of Lebanon